This is a list of members of the National Parliament of Papua New Guinea from 1987 to 1992, as elected at the 1987 election.

Notes

References

List
Papua New Guinea politics-related lists